Llandegveth is a village in Monmouthshire, south east Wales.

Location 
Llandegveth is located between Cwmbran, in Torfaen, and Usk in rural Monmouthshire.

History & amenities 
Llandegfedd Reservoir, located nearby is named after the village. It is famous for coarse fishing and holds record pike. It is also popular for open water diving, sailing and waterskiing.

External links

 Kelly's 1901 Directory of Monmouthshire on Llandegveth
 "Llandegveth" at maryinmonmouth.blogspot.co.uk

Villages in Monmouthshire